C. asiatica may refer to:
 Centella asiatica, a small herbaceous annual plant species native to Asia
 Colubrina asiatica, the latherleaf, Asian nakedwood or Asian snakewood, a shrub species native to Africa, India, southeast Asia, tropical Australia and the Pacific Islands

See also
 List of Latin and Greek words commonly used in systematic names#Asiatica